Labastide-Paumès is a commune in the Haute-Garonne department in southwestern France.

Population

Sights
The Château de Labastide-Paumès dates back in parts to the 9th century. The main building is circa 1164 castle which includes a large tower with a spiral staircase, built approximately one hundred years later. Privately owned, it has been listed since 1927 as a historic site by the French Ministry of Culture.

See also
Communes of the Haute-Garonne department

References

Communes of Haute-Garonne